Saybia is a Danish rock band formed in Nyborg in 1993.

History

From 1998 to 2000 they privately recorded three EPs (which they sold at their concerts) before signing to EMI in the spring of 2001. In the summer EMI released the 6 track EP "Saybia". In September 2001 the band went to Sweden to record their debut album The Second You Sleep. This album was recorded in "The Blue Room" in Gävle (Sweden), and was produced by Saybia and Swedish producer Andreas Ahlenius. The album was mixed at Medley Studios, Copenhagen DK. After the release on 21 January 2002, the band went on the road, touring Scandinavia and most of Northern Europe until Sep 2003. In 2003 Saybia released a Live-EP recorded 16 February at the venue "013" in Tilburg, NL. In autumn 2003, the band bought a house south of Copenhagen, and turned it into a rehearsal/recording studio. Saybia spent the winter recording demo's for the next record "These are the days". In January 2004 the band booked studio-time in "Sandkvie Studio", Visby on the Swedish island, Gotland, again together with producer Andreas Ahlenius. The album was mixed by Tchad Blake at "Real World Studios" GB. "These Are the Days" was released September 2004.
In August 2007 Saybia released their 3rd studio album "Eyes on the highway", which was recorded in the band's own studio "A Kind of Eden Studio", this time with producer Rune Nissen Petersen. The album was mixed by Producer Ryan Hewitt at "The Pass", Hollywood.
A new album has been announced, to be released in October 2015.

Band members
 Søren Huss (born 6 September 1975) – vocals, acoustic guitar
 Jeppe Langebek Knudsen (born 17 August 1976) – bass
 Palle Sørensen (born 8 September 1974) – drums
 Kasper Rasmussen – guitar
 Jess Jensen (born 8 March 1977) – keyboards

Former members 
 Sebastian Sandstrøm — guitar (1998—?)
 Thomas Dahl — guitar (1993—1998)

Discography

Albums

EPs

Singles
Charting singles

Other songs
2002: "The Day After Tomorrow" 
2002: "The Second You Sleep" 
2002: "In Spite Of" 
2004: "Brilliant Sky" 
2004: "Bend the Rules" 
2005: "Guardian Angel"

In other media
Veronica Mars – "Brilliant Sky" was featured in episode 1x11, "Silence of the Lamb".

Awards
In 2004 Saybia won an EBBA Award. Every year the European Border Breakers Awards (EBBA) recognize the success of ten emerging artists or groups who reached audiences outside their own countries with their first internationally released album in the past year.

References

External links
International fansite
Danish fansite

Danish rock music groups
People from Nyborg